The Division of Perth is an Australian electoral division in the state of Western Australia. It is named after Perth, the capital city of Western Australia, where the Division is located.

History

The division was proclaimed in 1900, and was one of the original 65 divisions to be contested at the first federal election. It extends northeast along the north bank of the Swan River from Perth, including suburbs such as Maylands, Mount Lawley, Bayswater, Ashfield, Bedford, Morley, Beechboro and the Perth city centre. It is a primarily residential area, although contains an industrial area at Bayswater and major commercial centres in Perth and Morley.

Between the 1940s and 1980s, it was a marginal seat that frequently changed hands between the Liberals (and their predecessors) and Labor. Recent demographic changes have made it a fairly safe Labor seat.

As of the last federal election, Perth has held the strongest Greens vote of all seats in Western Australia, at 18.87%. The growing Greens vote in the seat has come largely at the expense of the Labor Party, whose primary vote has dropped by 11.93% since 1993, when the Greens first contested the division of Perth. The Greens won their first ever booth in the seat in 2019 when the party came first on primary vote in Northbridge. Additionally, the party came a close second in the Highgate booth based on primary vote and also achieved over 20% in 20 of the booths for the first time. In 2022, the Greens polled 22.1% and came a clear second in 18 booths and topped the primary vote in Northbridge, Highgate North and Mount Lawley East.

Geography 
Since 1984, federal electoral division boundaries in Australia have been determined at redistributions by a redistribution committee appointed by the Australian Electoral Commission. Redistributions occur for the boundaries of divisions in a particular state, and they occur every seven years, or sooner if a state's representation entitlement changes or when divisions of a state are malapportioned.

In August 2021, the Australian Electoral Commission (AEC) announced that Perth's northern boundary would be altered to run almost entirely along Morley Drive. As a result, Perth's portion of the suburb of Noranda would be transferred to the seat of Cowan, while Perth would gain the suburbs of Joondanna, Tuart Hill, Yokine, the south-east of Osborne Park and the remainder of Coolbinia and Inglewood from the abolished seat of Stirling. In addition, minor changes would occur to Perth's portions of Dianella and Morley. These boundary changes came into effect for the 2022 Australian federal election.

Perth is bordered by the Swan River to the south and east, the Mitchell Freeway and Kings Park to the west, and Morley Drive to the north. It includes the local government areas of the City of Perth, the City of Vincent, the Town of Bassendean, most of the City of Bayswater, and a portion of the City of Stirling. Suburbs presently included are:

 Ashfield
 Bassendean 
 Bayswater 
 Bedford 
 Coolbinia
 Dianella (part)
 East Perth
 Eden Hill 
 Embleton
 Highgate 
 Inglewood
 Joondanna 
 Kings Park 
 Leederville
 Maylands 
 Menora 
 Morley (part)
 Mount Hawthorn 
 Mount Lawley
 Northbridge 
 North Perth
 Osborne Park (part)
 Perth
 Tuart Hill
 West Perth
 Yokine

Members

Election results

References

External links
 Division of Perth - Australian Electoral Commission

Electoral divisions of Australia
Constituencies established in 1901
1901 establishments in Australia
Federal politics in Western Australia